David Shaughnessy is an English actor, producer and director best known for his voice-work in Big Hero 6, Big Hero 6: The Series, Fallout 4, Labyrinth, Mass Effect, Peter Pan and the Pirates, Star Wars Rebels, The Darkness II, The Elder Scrolls and Warcraft. He has directed for shows such as Days of Our Lives, The Bold and the Beautiful and The Young and The Restless. He is the brother of actor Charles Shaughnessy.

Career
As an actor, Shaughnessy started in repertory theatres in the UK and went on to become a principal actor with The Old Vic in London and touring around the world. He went on to perform in national tours, including 18 months in Godspell for producer Cameron Mackintosh and has acted in a number of American and British films and television series.

Shaughnessy later turned to television and theatre directing. He directed the world premiere of Steve Brown's critically acclaimed musical, Elmer Gantry at the Chichester Festival Theatre. In 1985, he made his voice-over debut in Jim Henson's cult classic Labyrinth. He voiced Didymus, the Hat and various goblin characters. After appearing in several American films and television series, he became an executive producer of the daytime drama The Young and the Restless and has directed episodes of Santa Barbara (1987), The Young and the Restless, The Bold and the Beautiful , Days of Our Lives and many other shows. He continues to provide voice-work for animation, commercials, films and video games.

His father was Alfred Shaughnessy, a script writer best known for his work as head writer and producer of Upstairs, Downstairs. His older brother, Charles Shaughnessy, is also an actor best known as Maxwell Sheffield on The Nanny and Shane Donovan in Days of Our Lives, and currently holder of the title of Baron Shaughnessy; David is his brother's heir presumptive. His wife is former Days of Our Lives head writer Anne Schoettle. The two live in Los Angeles and have three daughters; Amy, Katie and Josie.

Director
 Santa Barbara (1987)
 Trial by Jury (1987)
 The Bold and the Beautiful (1988–2016)
 Tribes (1990)
 The Young and the Restless (1990–2004)
 Days of Our Lives (2019–present)

Filmography

Live-action

Film

Television

Voice acting

Film

Television

Video games

Awards and nominations
Daytime Emmy Award
 Win, 1993, 2004, Drama series, The Young and the Restless and 2013, 2015 Directing Team, The Bold & the Beautiful
 Nomination, 1999–2003, Drama series, The Young and the Restless, 2013 Directing team, The Bold & the Beautiful

Personal life
His wife is Anne Schoettle. They have three daughters Amy, Katie and Josie.

Executive producing tenure

References

External links
 Official website
 

Living people
English male stage actors
English male television actors
English male video game actors
English male voice actors
English people of Irish descent
English television directors
English television producers
Soap opera producers
20th-century English male actors
21st-century English male actors
Year of birth missing (living people)